Paralbara is a genus of moths belonging to the subfamily Drepaninae.

Species
 Paralbara muscularia Walker, 1866
 Paralbara achlyscarleta Chu & Wang
 Paralbara perhamata Hampson, 1892
 Paralbara spicula Watson, 1968
 Paralbara pallidinota Watson, 1968
 Paralbara watsoni Holloway, 1976

References

Drepaninae
Drepanidae genera